Holstebro RK is a Danish rugby club in Holstebro.

History
The club was founded in 1980.

References

External links
 Holstebro RK

Rugby clubs established in 1980
Danish rugby union teams